Lehmanotus is an extinct genus of prehistoric bony fish that lived during the Early Triassic epoch in what is now Madagascar. It belongs to Parasemionotidae together with Albertonia, Candelarialepis, Jacobulus, Parasemionotus, Qingshania, Stensioenotus, Suius, Thomasinotus and Watsonulus.

See also

 Prehistoric fish
 List of prehistoric bony fish

References

Parasemionotiformes
Early Triassic fish
Prehistoric animals of Madagascar
Prehistoric ray-finned fish genera